The geology of the Appalachians dates back to more than 480 million years ago. A look at rocks exposed in today's Appalachian Mountains reveals elongate belts of folded and thrust faulted marine sedimentary rocks, volcanic rocks and slivers of ancient ocean floor – strong evidence that these rocks were deformed during plate collision. The birth of the Appalachian ranges marks the first of several mountain building plate collisions that culminated in the construction of the supercontinent Pangaea with the Appalachians and neighboring Anti-Atlas mountains (now in Morocco) near the center. These mountain ranges likely once reached elevations similar to those of the Alps and the Rocky Mountains before they were eroded.

Geological history

Paleozoic Era 

During the earliest part of the Paleozoic Era, the continent that would later become North America straddled the equator. The Appalachian region was a passive plate margin, not unlike today's Atlantic Coastal Plain Province. During this interval, the region was periodically submerged beneath shallow seas. Thick layers of sediment and carbonate rock were deposited on the shallow sea bottom when the region was submerged. When seas receded, terrestrial sedimentary deposits and erosion dominated.

During the Middle Ordovician Period (about 458-470 million years ago), a change in plate motions set the stage for the first Paleozoic mountain building event (Taconic orogeny) in North America. The once quiet Appalachian passive margin changed to a very active plate boundary when a neighboring oceanic plate, the Iapetus, collided with and began sinking beneath the North American craton. With the creation of this new subduction zone, the early Appalachians were born.

Volcanoes grew along the continental margin, coincident with the initiation of subduction. Thrust faulting uplifted and warped older sedimentary rock laid down on the passive margin. As mountains rose, erosion began to wear them down. Streams carried rock debris downslope to be deposited in nearby lowlands.

This was just the first of a series of mountain-building plate collisions that contributed to the formation of the Appalachians. Mountain building continued periodically throughout the next 250 million years (Caledonian, Acadian, Ouachita, Hercynian, and Alleghanian orogenies). Continent after continent was thrust and sutured onto the North American craton as the Pangean supercontinent began to take shape. Microplates, smaller bits of crust too small to be called continents, were swept in one by one to be welded to the growing mass.

By about 300 million years ago (Pennsylvanian Period) Africa was approaching the North American craton. The collisional belt spread into the Ozark-Ouachita region and through the Marathon Mountains area of Texas. Continental collisions raised the Appalachian-Ouachita chain to a lofty mountain range on the scale of the present-day Himalayas. The massive bulk of Pangea was completed near the end of the Paleozoic Era (Permian Period) when Africa (Gondwana) plowed into the continental agglomeration, with the Appalachian-Ouachita mountains near the middle.

Mesozoic Era and later 
Pangea began to break up about 220 million years ago, in the Early Mesozoic Era (Late Triassic Period). As Pangea rifted apart a new passive tectonic margin was born, and the forces that created the Appalachian, Ouachita, and Marathon Mountains were stilled. Weathering and erosion prevailed, and the mountains began to wear away.

By the end of the Mesozoic Era, the Appalachian Mountains had been eroded to an almost flat plain. It was not until the region was uplifted during the Cenozoic Era that the distinctive topography of the present formed. Uplift rejuvenated the streams, which rapidly responded by cutting downward into the ancient bedrock. Some streams flowed along weak layers that define the folds and faults created many millions of years earlier. Other streams downcut so rapidly that they cut right across the resistant folded rocks of the mountain core, carving canyons across rock layers and geologic structures. The ridges of the Appalachian Mountain core represent erosion-resistant rock that remained after the rock above and beside it was eroded away.

Geologic provinces 

The Appalachian Mountains span across five geologic provinces (as defined by the USGS): the Appalachian Basin, the Blue Ridge Mountains, the Piedmont Province, the Adirondack Province, and the New England Province.

The Appalachian Basin 
The Appalachian Basin is a foreland basin containing Paleozoic sedimentary rocks of Early Cambrian through Early Permian age. From north to south, the Appalachian Basin Province crosses New York, Pennsylvania, eastern Ohio, West Virginia, western Maryland, eastern Kentucky, western Virginia, eastern Tennessee, northwestern Georgia, and northeastern Alabama. The northern end of the Appalachian Basin extends offshore into Lakes Erie and Ontario as far as the United States–Canada border.

The northwestern flank of the basin is a broad homocline that dips gently southeastward off the Cincinnati Arch. A complexly thrust faulted and folded terrane (Appalachian Fold and Thrust Belt or Eastern Overthrust Belt), formed at the end of the Paleozoic by the Alleghanian orogeny, characterizes the eastern flank of the basin.

Coal, oil, and gas production 
The Appalachian Basin is one of the most important coal producing regions in the U.S. and one of the biggest in the world. Appalachian Basin bituminous coal has been mined throughout the last three centuries. Currently, the coal primarily is used within the eastern U.S. or exported for electrical power generation, but some of it is suitable for metallurgical uses. Economically important coal beds were deposited primarily during Pennsylvanian time in a southeastward-thickening foreland basin. Coal and associated rocks form a clastic wedge that thickens from north to south, from Pennsylvania into southeast West Virginia and southwestern Virginia.

The Appalachian Basin has had a long history of oil and gas production. Discovery of oil in 1859 in the Drake Well, Venango County, Pennsylvania, marked the beginning of the oil and gas industry in the Appalachian Basin. The discovery well opened a prolific trend of oil and gas fields, producing from Upper Devonian, Mississippian, and Pennsylvanian sandstone reservoirs that extend from southern New York, across western Pennsylvania, central West Virginia, and eastern Ohio, to eastern Kentucky.

A second major trend of oil and gas production in the Appalachian Basin began with the discovery in 1885 of oil and gas in Lower Silurian Clinton sandstone reservoirs in Knox County, Ohio. By the late 1880s and early 1900s, the trend extended both north and south across east-central Ohio and included several counties in western New York where gas was discovered in Lower Silurian Medina Group sandstones. About 1900, large oil reserves were discovered in Silurian and Devonian carbonate reservoirs in east-central Kentucky. Important gas discoveries from the Lower Devonian Oriskany Sandstone in Cambridge County, Ohio, in 1924; Schuyler County, New York, in 1930; and Kanawha County, West Virginia, in 1936 opened a major gas-producing trend across parts of New York, Pennsylvania, Maryland, Ohio, West Virginia, Kentucky, and Virginia. Another drilling boom in the Appalachian Basin occurred in the 1960s in Morrow County, Ohio, where oil was discovered in the Upper Cambrian part of the Knox Dolomite.

Crystalline Appalachians 

The Blue Ridge, Piedmont, Adirondack, and New England Provinces are collectively known as the Crystalline Appalachians, because they consist of Precambrian and Cambrian igneous and metamorphic rocks.

The Blue Ridge Thrust Belt Province underlies parts of eight states from central Alabama to southern Pennsylvania. Along its western margin, the Blue Ridge is thrust over the folded and faulted margin of the Appalachian basin, so that a broad segment of Paleozoic strata extends eastward for tens of miles, buried beneath these subhorizontal crystalline thrust sheets. At the surface, the Blue Ridge consists of a mountainous to hilly region, the main component of which are the Blue Ridge Mountains that extend from Georgia to Pennsylvania. Surface rocks consist mainly of a core of moderate-to high-rank crystalline metamorphic or igneous rocks, which, because of their superior resistance to weathering and erosion, commonly rise above the adjacent areas of low-grade metamorphic and sedimentary rock. The province is bounded on the north and west by the Paleozoic strata of the Appalachian Basin Province and on the south by Cretaceous and younger sedimentary rocks of the Gulf Coastal Plain. It is bounded on the east by metamorphic and sedimentary rocks of the Piedmont Province.

The Adirondack and New England Provinces include sedimentary, meta-sedimentary, and plutonic igneous rocks, mainly of Cambrian and Ordovician age, similar lithologically to rocks in the Blue Ridge and Piedmont Provinces to the south. The uplifted, nearly circular Adirondack Mountains consist of a core of ancient Precambrian rocks that are surrounded by upturned Cambrian and Ordovician sedimentary rocks.

References

External links 
 USGS.gov: Tapestry
 USGS.gov: dds

Appalachians
Appalachians
Appalachians
Appalachians
Appalachians
Appalachians
.
Cenozoic United States
Cenozoic Canada
Ordovician United States
Ordovician Canada